The DTX form factor is a variation of ATX specification designed especially for small form factor PCs (especially for HTPCs) with dimensions of . An industry standard intended to enable interchangeability for systems similar to Shuttle's original "SFF" designs, AMD announced its development on January 10, 2007. AMD stated that the DTX form factor is an open standard, and is backward compatible with ATX form factor cases.

The specification provides for up to 2 expansion slots on a DTX motherboard, in the same position as the top two slots on an ATX or microATX board. The spec also provides for optional ExpressCard expansion slots on DTX motherboards.

Comparison
DTX is a shorter version of ATX and micro-ATX, and Mini-DTX is a slightly longer version of Mini-ITX. Mini-iTX can have only one expansion slot, whereas Mini-DTX has the same width and can have two expansion slots.

Benefits
There are several benefits DTX provides to reduce production costs.

 DTX will allow up to four motherboards – for low cost – per standard printed circuit board manufacturing panel sizes
 Mini-DTX will allow up to six motherboards – for low cost – per standard printed circuit board manufacturing panel sizes
 DTX motherboards can be manufactured in as few as four layers of printed circuit board wiring for motherboard cost savings
 By leveraging backward-compatibility with ATX infrastructure, vendors may gain a low-cost DTX product offering with little development expense

See also 
 BTX

References

External links
 Product Preview and Showcase - HotHardware
 DTX Homepage archive
 DTX Mechanical Interface Specification
 Press Release

Motherboard form factors